Group 9, by modern IUPAC numbering, is a group (column) of chemical elements in the periodic table. Members of Group 9 include cobalt (Co), rhodium (Rh), iridium (Ir) and meitnerium (Mt). These are all transition metals in the d-block, considered to be some of the most rare of which.

Like other groups, the members of this family show patterns in electron configuration, especially in the outermost shells, resulting in trends in chemical behavior;  however, rhodium deviates from the pattern.

"Group 9" is the modern standard designation for this group, adopted by the IUPAC in 1990.  

In the older group naming systems, this group was combined with group 8 (iron, ruthenium, osmium, and hassium) and group 10 (nickel, palladium, platinum, and darmstadtium) and called group "VIIIB" in the Chemical Abstracts Service (CAS) "U.S. system", or "VIII" in the old IUPAC (pre-1990) "European system" (and in Mendeleev's original table).

Chemistry

[*] Predicted.

The first three elements are hard silvery-white metals:

Cobalt is a metallic element that can be used to turn glass a deep blue color.

Rhodium can be used in jewelry as a shiny metal.

Iridium is mainly used as a hardening agent for platinum alloys.

All known isotopes of meitnerium are radioactive with short half-lives. Only minute quantities have been synthesized in laboratories. It has not been isolated in pure form, and its physical and chemical properties have not been determined yet.

See also
Iron group
Platinum group

References

Groups (periodic table)